Lada Engchawadechasilp is a Thai beauty pageant titleholder, who won the Miss Thailand World pageant in 2001. Born in Los Angeles, California, she represented Thailand in the Miss World 2001 pageant, where she was named Miss Photogenic. She is a graduate of UCLA.

References 

Living people
Miss World 2001 delegates
Lada Engchawadechasilp
Lada Engchawadechasilp
Lada Engchawadechasilp
University of California, Los Angeles alumni
Year of birth missing (living people)
Lada Engchawadechasilp
Miss Thailand World